Within the 20th century, there came the use of plastics in art. In the latter half of the century, plastic technology advanced so that it was feasible for artists to start using plastic and acrylics as an artwork medium.

Using found plastic 

Art made of commodity materials sometimes uses found objects made of plastic. Plastic containers are useful in papier-mâché for building frames.

Environmental artists are using salvaged beach plastic to create art as a means of bringing awareness of plastic pollution in earth's oceans. Examples include: Judith Selby Lang and Richard Lang, members of Women Eco Artists Dialog, and the photography of Chris Jordan.

Use of Liquid Acrylics
Liquid acrylics can be used to create two- and three-dimensional plastic images and objects. Artist, Tyler Turkle, pours multiple thin layers of pigmented liquid acrylic to form sheets of plastic that result in paintings and sculptures. After adequate drying time between applications, these solid plastic sheets can be readily peeled off most surfaces and readhered to others. Examples can be seen in the “Other plastic artwork” images below.

Other plastic artwork

See also
Acrylic paint
New materials in 20th-century art
Plastic arts

References

Visual arts materials